Mahabad County is in West Azerbaijan province, Iran. The capital of the county is the city of Mahabad. At the 2006 census, the county's population was 197,441 in 42,493 households. The following census in 2011 counted 215,529 people in 53,563 households. At the 2016 census, the county's population was 236,849 in 65,562 households. Because of its strategic position and its proximity with the border the city is a stop for many travelers.

Administrative divisions

The population history and structural changes of Mahabad County's administrative divisions over three consecutive censuses are shown in the following table. The latest census shows two districts, five rural districts, and two cities.

Geography

The climate is mountainous with cold winters and temperate summers. Mahabad river flows through the capital.

References

 

Counties of West Azerbaijan Province